Es goyobod is an Indonesian drink from West Java. The origin of coconut milk based cold beverage similar to es campur.  It is made with shaved ice, coconut milk, sugar syrup, and jellied mung bean starch known as hunkwe. Other ingredients may include avocado and shredded coconut.

See also

 List of Indonesian beverages

References

Indonesian drinks
Foods containing coconut